William McFaddin may refer to:

William M. McFaddin (1819–1898), served in the Texas Revolution
William Perry Herring McFaddin (1856–1935), Texas rancher